Pauline Elisabeth Smeets (born 10 February 1959, in Heerlen) is a former Dutch politician. As a member of the Labour Party (Partij van de Arbeid) she was an MP from 30 January 2003 to 19 September 2012. She focused on matters of small and medium enterprises, corporate social responsibility, tourism, recreation and regional economic policy.

References 
  Parlement.com biography

1959 births
Living people
Labour Party (Netherlands) politicians
Members of the House of Representatives (Netherlands)
Municipal councillors in Limburg (Netherlands)
People from Heerlen
21st-century Dutch politicians
21st-century Dutch women politicians